Artur Bruno Rojas da Silva (born 27 May 1993) is a Bolivian sprinter. He competed in 100 metres at the 2012 Summer Olympics in London, where he had the honor of winning the first 100-metre heat.

He participated at the 2020 Summer Olympics on Universality places for ending his career.

Personal bests

Competition record

References

External links

1993 births
Living people
Sportspeople from Cochabamba
Bolivian male sprinters
Athletes (track and field) at the 2012 Summer Olympics
Athletes (track and field) at the 2020 Summer Olympics
Olympic male sprinters
Olympic athletes of Bolivia
Athletes (track and field) at the 2010 Summer Youth Olympics